The capital cost tax factor (CCTF) is a calculated value summarising the benefit in future tax savings due to Capital Cost Allowance (CCA) in Canada.

CCTF allows analysts to take these benefits into account when calculating the present value of an asset. The CCTF is a constant, that is a function of the Capital Cost Allowance rate, the interest rate, and the tax rate.  CCTF allows the analyst to find the present value independently of the initial cost of the asset.

There are two ways to calculate CCTF. The older method was replaced on November 13, 1981, but is still used for assets purchased before that date.

Capital Cost Tax Factor = 1-（td）/(i+d); 
 t= tax rate; i= interest rate; d= capital cost allowance;

External links
Tax Benefits Of Health Insurance

Taxation in Canada
Capital gains taxes